The 2021–22 Gibraltar Women's Football League is the sixth season of 11-a-side women's football in Gibraltar since the territory joined UEFA in 2013, and FIFA in 2016. The league had been in operation for a number of years previously, but teams were ineligible for entry to the UEFA Women's Champions League as it was only a 9-a-side tournament. Lions Gibraltar were the reigning champions from the previous season, which had been shortened due to the COVID-19 pandemic.

This season is set to be the first since the 2016–17 season where more than 3 teams participate, with two new teams entering the competition. Lions Gibraltar retained their title in March 2022, having won every single game and conceding no goals throughout, with 115 goals in 12 games.

Teams
Gibraltar Wave joined the league for the first time, having first competed in the 2021 Women's Futsal League following their foundation at the start of the year. Manchester 62 returned to the league following a 5-year absence.

Note: Flags indicate national team as has been defined under FIFA eligibility rules. Players may hold more than one non-FIFA nationality.

Managerial Changes

League table

Results

Note: Gibraltar Wave were awarded a 3–0 walkover win over Lynx on 12 January after Lynx failed to field a team, as were Europa on 9 February. Lions Gibraltar were also awarded a 3–0 win over Lynx on 19 January after their game against Lynx was abandoned.

Season statistics

Scoring

Top scorers

Hat-tricks

Clean Sheets

References

External links
Association website

2020–21 domestic women's association football leagues
Football leagues in Gibraltar